Millersville is an unincorporated community in western Cape Girardeau County, Missouri, United States. It is located six miles (10 km) west of Jackson on Route 72.

Millersville is part of the Cape Girardeau–Jackson, MO-IL Metropolitan Statistical Area.

A post office called Millersville has been in operation since 1866.

Demographics

Etymology

The community was named after the local Miller family.

Historic site

The Miller-Seabaugh House and Dr. Seabaugh Office Building was listed on the National Register of Historic Places in 1996.

Education
It is in the Jackson R-2 School District, which operates Jackson High School.

References

Unincorporated communities in Cape Girardeau County, Missouri
Cape Girardeau–Jackson metropolitan area
Unincorporated communities in Missouri